The Society for the National Heritage of Iran (SNH) was a grassroots political and archeological group created by a group of educated, and nationalistic Iranians in 1922, toward the end of the Qajar governance in Iran. The society was composed of influential Iranian figures of the time with the overall goal of preservation of Iranian artifacts, archeological sites, and protection of the Iranian culture. Iran in 1922 was influenced by internal and external forces, and the SNH reflects this tug of war between what was the external forces mainly from Europe, and internal/social factors.

Background

Early 1900s were time of discovery and archeological exploration in Iran. It was also time of social and political change. The Persian Constitutional Revolution of 1906 had rocked the perception of the absolute control of the king in society. It created an Iranian Parliament and had reduced the monarch's power. The Constitutional Revolution was in some ways the first political expression of the public sphere, that the poets and the literati, now completely out of the Qajar court had drafted with diligence and steadfast determination. The foreign interest in archeology and Iranian history has also peaked with several well known scholars from France, England and Russia vying for control. France in particular was very influential in preservation of the Iranian artifacts and in fact the involved French parties exhibited both interest in Persian history, and archeology and at the same time feared that these artifacts would be dispersed and sold. France would play a critical role in protection of Iranian artifacts but ironically it also wanted an absolute monopoly for all Persian artifacts in Iran. Renown French archeologist Jacques de Morgan in fact wanted to preserve Persian art to the point that in 1897 proposed to the Naser al-Din Shah the idea of creation of a National Archeological museum in Tehran.

In spite of his pure interest in Persian artifacts in Iran, after the first few seasons of archeological excavations in Iran yielded numerous rare finds, de Morgan changed his opinion and advocated an absolute French monopoly on all finds and proposed transfer of all Iranian discoveries to France. This attitude was not only unique to de Morgan and was shared by all French emissaries to Iran. In spite of their great contribution to Iranian artifacts specially in such places as Susa, France's insistence on its absolute monopoly would lead to other foreign powers being involved in Iran and the development of resentment by the secular Iranian intellectuals who did not want Iran's history broken up and exported. France's prime position in Iran, specially through influences on political figures such as the Prime minister Mirza Ali Asghar Khan Amin al-Sultan under Naser al-Din Shah Qajar meant that France could convince the king to abandon the project. In fact Naser al-Din shah abandoned the project and it was not till years later when the National Museum's construction took place in 1917 under the supervision of Morteza Khan Momtas al-Molk (Morteza Gholi).

It was in this context that after the 1921 Persian coup d'etat led by Reza Shah Pahlavi and Zia'eddin Tabatabaee and unification of Iran, a group of patriotic, educated Iranian figures namely Mohammad Ali Foroughi (Zoka al-Molk), Ebrahim Hakimi (Hakim al-Molk), and Hassan Pirnia (Moshir al-Dowleh) created a cultural group that would later be known as the SNH with the aim of protecting and advocating Iran's patrimony.

Goals and Achievements

The goal of the SNH was in a general sense to preserve, protect and promote Iranian patrimony but in a specific sense it focused on three aspects: 1) Establishing a museum and library in Tehran and Ending the prestigious but monopolized French archeology in Iran, 2) proper identification, registration of all artifacts and monuments that were in need of repair or catalog, and 3) preparing and recording a list of all antiques in possession of government or other groups pertaining to ancient Iran's history. The group would be instrumental in eliciting the proper funds from the Iranian Parliament in order to achieve the aforementioned goals.

Architectural Projects

The group was able to secure enough funds from the Iranian parliament to remodel and build the Tomb of Ferdowsi as well as being critical in its design and its use of the Achaemenid architectural styling. The project was started in 1928 and ended in 1934 to coincide with Ferdowsi Millenary Celebration. The group also expanded and had close connection to other secular figures at the times including Abdolhossein Teymourtash, and Keikhosrow Shahrokh. The official group members and the ancillary associates were critical in the decision making process and in fact often influenced each other. Perhaps as impressive as the group's involvement was in creation of the Tomb of Ferdowsi in Tus, Iran, it was an equally critical player in creation of the Tomb of Avicenna (Mausoleum of Avicenna) in Hamedan, Iran in 1944. The group was also involved in creation of Saadi Shirazi's mausoleum in Shiraz, Iran, creation of Nadir Shah mausoleum and museum in Mashhad, Iran, creation of the mausoleum of Baba Tahir, in Hamedan, Iran, and creation of tomb of Omar Khayyam in Nishapur, Iran. The group was involved in countless culturally-themed architectural endeavors. The table at the bottom of this article denotes their most significant contributions.

Archeological Monopoly

Although not directly involved in ending the French monopoly, the SNH was part of a broader national movement to end French monopoly in Iran and to nationalize the ownership of the artifacts. The group invited speeches by such archeological figures at the time as Ernst Herzfeld head of German Institute of Oriental Archeology, and the well known American archeologist Arthur Upham Pope in form of conferences. The first publication of the group was in fact made with help of Herzfeld and was a list of all historical archeological sites in Iran. Reza Shah did not interfere with the works of Ernst Herzfeld or the French archeologists neither did he take sides, but he did ensure that their excavations go smooth and that Persian monuments are recovered with the best portion of them going to Iranian ownership. The combined efforts of the SNH and other cultural and historical groups at the time led to Iran having the majority monopoly over the recovery of its own artifacts and discoveries.

Linguistic Influence

Although primarily an architectural and political entity, the SNH also advocated or assisted individuals who had hoped for a revitalization of the Persian language. One major move at the time of SNH was de-listing Arabic loan words and replacing them with old or new Persian words. Even though SNH was involved in publications and advocacy of a more cohesive Persian language, it was intellectuals such as Sadiq Kiya and Ibrahim Purdavus who through their publications, and their focus on Ferdowsi's Shahnameh created a Persian vocabulary that was mainly New, Middle, or Old Persian in origin. Nonetheless through its publications SNH was a force behind removing of foreign words from Persian.

Legacy
Nearly every significant Persian poet whose mausoleum is in Iran has benefited from SNH's involvement. SNH has been critical in protection and identification of Iranian artifacts and language as well. Iran having a significant Pre-Islamic history, as well an equally significant history after Islam, has always suffered from a dichotomy in its loyalties between what is essentially a desire for heritage and one that is a desire for religion. The political systems in Iran seem not to be immune to this dichotomy as well. The SNH and indeed the Pahlavi dynasty seem to embrace the Iranian identity but ignore the Islamic identity of Iran, whilst the current regime in Iran, headed by Muslim clerics, seems to ignore or downplay Iranian identity in favor of an Islamic identity.

Archeological works
The following table denotes the list of mausoleums erected or repaired/updated by the SNH in Iran:

See also
Ministry of Cultural Heritage, Handicrafts and Tourism

References

1922 establishments in Iran
Architecture in Iran
Archaeology of Iran
Qajar Iran